Rebecca Peters is a political advocate for gun control who served as Director of the International Action Network on Small Arms (IANSA) from 2002 to 2010. , Peters was listed on the IANSA board of directors.

Background

Rebecca Peters studied law.

As chair of the Australian National Coalition for Gun Control at the time of the Port Arthur massacre in 1996, Peters contributed to the introduction of stricter gun control in Australia, working on the homogenization of gun laws across Australia's 6 states and 2 territories, the ban on semiautomatic rifles and shotguns, and a year-long buyback that destroyed nearly 700,000 weapons. In a televised debate with Ian McNiven, vice-president of the Firearms Owners Association, the latter declared that guns were necessary for men to defend women against the invasion of Indonesians in Australia, to which she replied that domestic violence was probably a much bigger issue. Thinking his microphone was off, he muttered back «I tell you what, if I was married to Rebecca Peters I'd probably commit domestic violence too», thus exemplifying the gender issue in the gun politics arena.

She worked for the Open Society Institute, a private foundation funded by George Soros. From 2002 to 2010, Rebecca Peters served as Director of the International Action Network on Small Arms (IANSA).

In 2014, she moved to Guatemala to lobby in favor of stricter gun control policies, and to fundraise for the Transitions Foundation of Guatemala, a foundation specialized in helping disabled victims of gun violence.

She has been criticized by the United States National Rifle Association which claims that Peters «is the voice and face of hatred of gun owners and Second Amendment freedoms.»

Recognitions
1996: Australian Human Rights Medal for her contribution to researching, educating and lobbying for gun law reforms in Australia.
2007: Officer of the Order of Australia for distinguished service to the community as an advocate and campaigner for gun control.

See also

Gun politics in Australia
Gun politics in the United States
Small arms proliferation issues

References

External links
IANSA - official web site
Interview following U.S. Massacre at Newtown, Connecticut

Living people
Australian activists
Gun control advocates
Year of birth missing (living people)
Officers of the Order of Australia